Acta Musicologica is the official peer-reviewed journal of the International Musicological Society, which has its headquarters in Basel, Switzerland. It contains articles on musicological research of international importance in five different languages (English, French, German, Italian, and Spanish) and is published semiannually by Bärenreiter.

Abstracting and indexing 
The journal is abstracted and indexed in:
 Arts and Humanities Citation Index
 JSTOR
 Répertoire International de Littérature Musicale
 Scopus

References

External links 
 
 Website of the International Musicological Society
 Acta Musicologica at 
 Acta Musicologica, Project MUSE

Publications established in 1928
Music journals
English-language journals